Louis Armand, Baron de Lahontan (9 June 1666 – prior to 1716) served in the French military in Canada where he traveled extensively in the Wisconsin and Minnesota region and the upper Mississippi Valley. Upon his return to Europe he wrote an enormously popular travelogue. In it he recounted his voyage up the "Long River," now thought to be the Missouri. He wrote at length and in very positive terms about Native American culture, portraying Indian people as free, rational, and generally admirable.

Early life 
He was born into the aristocracy and inherited the title Baron Lahontan upon his father's death in 1674. De Lahontan joined the troupes de la marine and was sent to New France in 1683 at age 17 along with two other officers and three companies of troops. After arriving at Quebec in November and settling in Beaupré, he would lead his company in 1684 on an unsuccessful offense against the Iroquois from Fort Frontenac.

Explorer

Having already faced the reality of settler life in Beaupré, de Lahontan again led his men to Boucherville to live with local habitants between 1685 and 1687 – himself dividing his time between hunting and classical literature. Just prior to a decision to return to France, Lahontan was ordered –at least in part because of his knowledge of the Algonkian language- to head a detachment of French and native troops towards Fort St. Joseph where he would launch another attack on the Iroquois. He was a restless commander and spent much of his time exploring the region. In 1688 following news of the abandonment of the post at Niagara and renewed attacks of the Iroquois, he burned his fort and led his men to Michillimackinac in search of supplies and possibly entertainment for his men. De Lahontan felt that without supplies from Niagara his dwindling stores would not be enough to last the winter. During the winter and spring months he explored the upper Mississippi valley where he ascended the “Rivière Longue”; some scholars consider this a fanciful tale, others argue that he had discovered the Missouri River.

King William's War 
During King William's War, De Lahontan submitted several proposals for military fortification and equipment in New France such as a Great Lakes Flotilla for defense against the Iroquois and a line of forts meant for defence along the western frontier, both on behalf of Governor Frontenac in 1692. Further, he led a successful offense against five English frigates of Phipp's invasion fleet in the Gulf of St. Lawrence in 1690 under Frontenac. Though his proposal for a Great Lakes flotilla was ultimately rejected on the basis of cost, de Lahontan would be promoted to King's Lieutenant.

At Placentia, he defended the capital from a siege in 1692. On 13 December 1692 following a conflict with the governor of Placentia (Newfoundland), Jacques-François de Monbeton de Brouillan, de Lahontan decided to abandon his office and New France altogether.

He deserted and took ship for Viana, Portugal. Deprived of his inheritance and unable to return to France, he eventually arrived in Amsterdam on 14 April. During an unknown period of time in Saragossa, Spain, until at least 1696, de Lahontan recorded his memoirs for the English government explaining how and why they should take French controlled Canada.

Author 
Upon return to Amsterdam in 1703 he published his three most famous works: Nouveaux Voyages dans l’Amerique Septentrionale, Memoires de l’Amerique Septentrionale, and Supplement aux Voyages ou Dialogues avec le sauvage Adario. Nouveaux Voyages dans l’Amerique Septentrionale provides a thorough and detailed account of de Lahontan's life and stay in New France, while Memoires de l’Amerique Septentrionale describes his observations of geography, institutions, commerce as well as information about native tribes. Finally, Supplement aux Voyages ou Dialogues avec le sauvage Adario lambasts institutional Christianity by means of a dialogue between de Lahontan and a Huron Chief named Adario (The Rat). The author attempts to contrast the injustice of Christianity with the freedom and justice of native people.

See also

New Voyages to North America

Links 
 
 Lom d'Arce at the Canadian Museum of History: CV, animated map of his expedition to Saint-Louis; English or French

References

French military personnel
French travel writers
French explorers of North America
1666 births
18th-century deaths
Explorers of the United States
French male non-fiction writers